Tavola may refer to:

Kaliopate Tavola (born 1946), Fijian economist, diplomat, politician and Minister for Foreign Affairs
Roberto Tavola (born 1957), retired Italian professional football player

See also
Gran Tavola (Italian for "Great Table") was the largest Sienese bank, and one of the most powerful banks in Europe from 1255 to 1298
In music, the belly of a Sound board (music)